Guillermo Ricardo Simari is an Argentine computer scientist born in the city of Buenos Aires. He has headed the Artificial Intelligence Research and Development Lab (LIDIA) at National University of the South since 1990.

Since December 2018, he is Professor Emeritus of Logic in Computer Science and Artificial Intelligence at National University of the South.

He is co-editor of the Journal of Argument & Computation, and co-editor of the Argumentation Corner of the Journal of Logic and Computation with Francesca Toni and Phan Minh Dung.

He earned his Ph.D. in 1989 at Washington University in St. Louis under the supervision of Ronald Loui.

References

External links 
DBLP record of Publications http://www.informatik.uni-trier.de/~ley/db/indices/a-tree/s/Simari:Guillermo_Ricardo.html
Google Scholar Guillermo R. Simari
Argumentation in Artificial Intelligence | SpringerLink (with Iyad Rahwan)
Trends in Belief Revision and Argumentation Dynamics (with Eduardo Fermé and Dov Gabbay)
 College Publications - Logic and cognitive systems
Guillermo R. Simari personal web page
IJCAI-15 web page Home (Local Arrangements Chair)
Dagstuhl Seminars Schloss Dagstuhl : Seminar Homepage, Schloss Dagstuhl : Seminar Homepage

Argentine computer scientists
Living people
Academic staff of Universidad Nacional del Sur
Universidad Nacional del Sur alumni
Washington University in St. Louis alumni
1948 births